Howard Wallace Parker (April 14, 1898 – August 23, 1972), sometimes listed as Herbert Wallace Parker, was the head coach of the  Central Michigan college football program from 1921 to 1923 and again from 1923 to 1928. He also served as Central Michigan's basketball coach, and later their athletic director. He played college football, basketball and baseball at Syracuse. He died in 1972 at age 74 in Syracuse, New York.

Head coaching record

Football

See also
 List of college football head coaches with non-consecutive tenure

References

External links
 Player Profile @ OrangeHoops

1898 births
1972 deaths
American men's basketball players
Guards (basketball)
Central Michigan Chippewas athletic directors
Central Michigan Chippewas baseball coaches
Central Michigan Chippewas football coaches
Central Michigan Chippewas men's basketball coaches
Syracuse Orangemen baseball players
Syracuse Orange football players
Syracuse Orange men's basketball players
Players of American football from Chicago
Baseball players from Chicago
Basketball players from Chicago